Valley Hill is an unincorporated community located in Carroll County, Mississippi, United States on U.S. Route 82, approximately  east of Greenwood and approximately  west of Carrollton.

Valley Hill is part of the Greenwood, Mississippi micropolitan area.

Valley Hill is located on the former Southern Railway.

A post office first began operation under the name Valley Hill in 1858.

References

Unincorporated communities in Carroll County, Mississippi
Unincorporated communities in Mississippi